Brian Bruce Baumgartner (born November 29, 1972) is an American actor. He is best known for playing Kevin Malone, a character in the NBC sitcom The Office (2005–2013).

Early Life and Education 
Born in Atlanta, Georgia, Baumgartner attended Holy Innocents' Episcopal School. He attended and graduated from The Westminster Schools in 1991, one year before his co-star on The Office Ed Helms graduated. During his time at The Westminster School, Baumgartner competed in competitive speech events, drama, reaching the national finals his senior year. Between his junior and senior year of high school, Baumgartner also attended Northwestern University’s National High School Institute, where he focused on theater. He later attended Southern Methodist University, where he majored in theater and graduated in 1995.

He later moved to Los Angeles and served as Artistic Director of Hidden Theatre in Minneapolis, Minnesota, where he received multiple awards for artistic and acting excellence. Later, Baumgartner performed regionally at the Guthrie Theater, Berkeley Repertory Theatre, Children's Theater Company, and Theatre de la Jeune Lune.

Career 
Baumgartner has had roles on the television shows Jake in Progress, Arrested Development and Everwood. He served as a celebrity talent scout on Last Comic Standing with his The Office co-star Kate Flannery and starred with Robin Williams, Mandy Moore and John Krasinski in License to Wed. He also appeared in Ingrid Michaelson's music video for "Time Machine".

The Office 
Baumgartner is best remembered for portraying accountant Kevin Malone in American remake of the British series The Office. In June 2007, Baumgartner won a Daytime Emmy Award for Outstanding Broadband Program - Comedy for his work on The Office: The Accountants webisodes. His co-stars Angela Kinsey and Oscar Nunez also shared the award. In 2020, he hosted and executive produced An Oral History of The Office, a podcast for Spotify that featured interviews with his The Office co-stars. In 2021, he hosted and executive produced a podcast for iHeart: The Office Deep Dive with Brian Baumgartner. This podcast features the full-length, in depth interviews with the cast and crew of The Office originally heard in An Oral History of The Office.

Filmography

References

External links
 
 

1972 births
21st-century American male actors
American male film actors
American male television actors
Living people
Male actors from Atlanta
Southern Methodist University alumni
The Westminster Schools alumni
American podcasters